Mackenroth is a surname. Notable people with the surname include:

Anna Mackenroth, (born 1861), born in Germany, was Zurich's first practicing female lawyer
Jack Mackenroth (born 1969), American swimmer, model and fashion designer
Terry Mackenroth (born 1949), Australian politician

Surnames of German origin